Bukit Gambir is a small town in Tangkak District, Johor, Malaysia.

History
The area was declared a town in 2003.

Geography
The town consists of 40,000 residents.

Education

Primary schools

Secondary school

Transportation
 Bukit Gambir Road

Notable natives
 Onn Jaafar

References

Towns in Johor
Towns, suburbs and villages in Tangkak